1979 Egypt Cup Final, was the final match of the 1978–79 Egypt Cup, was between Zamalek and Ghazl El Mahalla, Zamalek won the match 3–0.

Match details

References

External links
 http://www.angelfire.com/ak/EgyptianSports/ZamalekInEgyptCup.html#1979

1979
EC 1979
EC 1979